Sir John Benn, 1st Baronet (1850–1922) was a British politician.

John Benn may also refer to:

 Jon T. Benn (1935–2018), American actor
 Sir John Benn, 3rd Baronet (1904–1984), of the Benn baronets

See also
Benn (surname)